Bridei son of Uurad  was king of the Picts, in modern Scotland, from 842 to 843. Two of his brothers, Ciniod and Drest, are also said, in the king lists of the Pictish Chronicle, to have reigned for a short time.

References 

843 deaths
Pictish monarchs
9th-century Scottish monarchs
Year of birth unknown